Hermeuptychia hermes, the Hermes satyr, is a species of Hermeuptychia butterfly in the family Nymphalidae. It is found from southern Texas through Mexico to Brazil (Rio de Janeiro and Mato Grosso do Sul), Suriname and Bolivia. The habitat consists of forest edges and shaded lawns.

The wingspan is about 31 mm.

References

Butterflies described in 1775
Euptychiina
Fauna of Brazil
Nymphalidae of South America
Butterflies of Trinidad and Tobago
Taxa named by Johan Christian Fabricius